The Gurun railway station is a Malaysian railway station located at and named after the town of Gurun, Kedah. KTM ETS trains serve this station. Gurun was also the northern terminus of the KTM Komuter Northern Sector before it was moved to Padang Besar in July 2016.

The new Gurun railway station was built as part of the Ipoh–Padang Besar Electrification and double-tracking Project and was reopened on 11 June 2014. The new station replaces and old wooden one which was demolished.

Train services
ETS Gold Train No. 9420/9425

References

External links
Kuala Lumpur MRT & KTM Intercity Integrations

KTM ETS railway stations
Railway stations opened in 1915
Railway stations in Kedah